USS Nye County (LST-1067) was an  in the United States Navy. Unlike many of her class, which received only numbers and were disposed of after World War II, she survived long enough to be named. On 1 July 1955, all LSTs still in commission were named for US counties or parishes; LST-1067 was given the name Nye County, after a county in Nevada.

Construction
LST-1067 was laid down on 24 January 194,5 at Hingham, Massachusetts, by the Bethlehem-Hingham Shipyard; launched on 27 February 1945; and commissioned on 24 March 1945.

Service history

World War II 
Upon completing shakedown along the Virginia coast, LST–1067 sailed to Davisville, Rhode Island, to load materials of war. Departing 16 May 1945, she steamed via the Panama Canal, first to Pearl Harbor, and then with additional cargo, to Guam, arriving 19 July. A second logistic voyage from the Hawaiian Islands to the Marianas occurred in the immediate aftermath of the Japanese surrender. She then embarked occupation forces at Leyte, and landed them on Honshū, Japan, 2 November. Turning eastward for the long trip to the United States, LST–1067 arrived at San Francisco, on 6 January 1946, and decommissioned at Portland, Oregon, on 13 August 1946.

Reserve 
Named Nye County 1 July 1955, the landing ship recommissioned "in reserve" 22 May 1963, and was assigned to the newly created RESLSTRON 2 based at Little Creek, Virginia. The value of this squadron during the Dominican Republic crisis brought a full commissioning 21 December 1965, and new duties in the Western Pacific.

Vietnam War 
Though based at Sasebo, Japan, Nye County spent much time between April 1966 and March 1967, offloading supplies at critical points along the central coast of South Vietnam. Ordered to Pusan, Korea, she decommissioned 27 March 1967, and was turned over to the Military Sea Transportation Service. Manned largely by a Korean crew, she continued to sail in Far Eastern waters in 1970, as USNS Nye County (T-LST-1067).

Chilean Navy service
She was later sold to Chile, 1 August 1973, where she was renamed Commandante Araya (LST-89). She was taken out of service 14 December 1981, and sold for scrapping 29 March 1982.

Awards
Nye County earned two battle stars for the Vietnam War.

Notes

Citations

Bibliography 

Online resources

External links
 

 

LST-542-class tank landing ships
Nye County, Nevada
Ships built in Hingham, Massachusetts
1945 ships
World War II amphibious warfare vessels of the United States
Cold War amphibious warfare vessels of the United States
Vietnam War amphibious warfare vessels of the United States
LST-542-class tank landing ships of the Chilean Navy
Pacific Reserve Fleet, Astoria Group